Robert Bernard Gottlieb (born 1944) is an American academic, activist, journalist, and writer. From 1997 to 2015, he was the Henry R. Luce Professor of Urban and Environmental Policy at Occidental College where he also served as co-founder and executive director of the Urban & Environmental Policy Institute. He has written fourteen books on regional politics and economies, global cities, and environmental, food, and social justice topics.

Biography

Community engagement
Gottlieb has long been engaged in social justice issues, including as an advocate of action research and community-engaged teaching. He co-founded the Pollution Prevention Education and Research Center at the University of California, Los Angeles (UCLA) in 1991 and subsequently organized the Urban & Environmental Policy Institute (UEPI) when he took his new position at Occidental in 1997. Through his research and teaching and through UEPI he helped supervise numerous projects at Occidental and UCLA that helped stimulate new and continuing social, environmental, and food justice movements and policy initiatives. These include the farm-to-school and farm to pre-school programs that are now available in all 50 states in the US, the development of Food Policy Councils, toxics reduction programs and policies, alternative transportation strategies and participation in innovative community and academic collaborations.

Works
Gottlieb's writings address critical social change issues including power, resistance, and the barriers and opportunities for social change.

Thinking Big (1977)
Gottlieb and Irene Wolt's book, Thinking Big: the Story of the Los Angeles Times, its Publishers and their Influence on Southern California, emerged from discussions in the early 1970s about the need for an alternative newspaper for Southern California whose primary source of news and opinion at that time was the Los Angeles Times. Carey McWilliams,  called Thinking Big “a first-rate study.” Ben Bagdikian, the former National Editor of the Washington Post, characterized it as “a comprehensive and clear-eyed account of one of the most important newspapers in America [that represented] “a service to both the cause of better newspapers and to the citizenry at large.”

Empires in the Sun (1985) and America’s Saints (1984)
Gottlieb teamed up with Peter Wiley in the 1970s and 1980s to write about water, energy, land, and political issues in the Western US. They wrote many articles and a weekly column, Points West, that appeared in several dozen publications. Their first co-authored book, Empires in the Sun: the Rise of the New American West, profiled six western cities: Salt Lake, Phoenix, Las Vegas, Denver, Los Angeles and San Francisco. According to Joan Nice of High Country News, the book told of “how the West works, how its decisions are made, who pulls the strings and pockets the profits.”  Expanding their research to include the politics and power of the Church of Jesus Christ of Latter-day Saints which played an outsized role in Salt Lake, Phoenix, and Las Vegas led to their second book, America’s Saints: the Rise of Mormon Power, which provided an economic, political, and cultural profile of the church.

A Life of its Own (1988)
Actively engaged in water resource and water quality issues, Gottlieb published numerous articles as well as two books on the topic: A Life of its Own: the Politics and Power of Water, and Thirst for Growth: Water Agencies as Hidden Government in California, co-authored with Margaret FitzSimmons. His book with FitzSimmons provided a detailed analysis of the structure and decision-making of six Southern California water agencies, including the Metropolitan Water District of Southern California on whose board Gottlieb served. Barry Commoner said of Gottlieb's role in water politics that he had “the incisive knowledge of an insider and the courage of an outsider.”

War on Waste (1989) and Reducing Toxics (1995)
Gottlieb's focus on university-related community engagement led to two other collaborative publications, War on Waste: Can America Win its Battle with Garbage? co-authored with Louis Blumberg and Reducing Toxics: A New Approach to Policy and Industrial Decision-making. War on Waste evolved out of a student project that included a team of six UCLA graduate students whom Gottlieb supervised. The purpose of their study was to evaluate the health, environmental, and community impacts from a proposed waste-to-energy incinerator to be located in a low-income community. Reducing Toxics, which Gottlieb edited and to which he contributed several chapters, was a collaborative effort of four UCLA Professors (Gottlieb, John Froines, David Allen, and Julie Roque) and several of their students. The book drew upon the research of the Pollution Prevention Education and Research Center that the four professors had established at UCLA.

Forcing the Spring (1993) and Environmentalism Unbound (2001)
Gottlieb spent several years pulling together a “revisionist history of environmentalism,” as Professor Robert Manning described it, that situated the historical antecedents of environmental justice. The book that resulted, Forcing the Spring: the Transformation of the American Environmental Movement, provided, according to a review in The Journal of the American Planning Association, “a more complex, vibrant, socially critical and justice-oriented history and perspective on American environmentalism than most of us are used to.” Gottlieb continued to document the different layers of environmental justice through a series of case studies on such diverse topics as dry cleaning, janitorial cleaning products, and food system change, drawn from the work of UEPI, that were described in his subsequent book, Environmentalism Unbound: Exploring New Pathways for Change.

The Next Los Angeles (2005) and Reinventing Los Angeles (2007)
Since his arrival in Los Angeles in 1970, Gottlieb has focused on the Southern California region as the objective and the source of his research, policy engagement, and activism. In 1998, through UEPI, he co-founded the Progressive Los Angeles Network (PLAN) and organized a conference on the history and contemporary role of progressive movements in Los Angeles. PLAN then set up a series of working groups to develop a comprehensive policy agenda in advance of the 2001 Los Angeles mayoral election. The PLAN agenda was subsequently incorporated into a book, The Next Los Angeles: the Struggle for a Livable City, that he co-authored with three of his Occidental College and UEPI colleagues (Mark Vallianatos, Regina Freer, and Peter Dreier). Gottlieb subsequently published his major work on the Los Angeles region as Reinventing Los Angeles: Nature and Community in the Global City, which drew on his UEPI-based action research regarding water, the Los Angeles River, cars and transportation policy, and migrations. It also described the planning and implementation of key events and actions, including a bike ride and walk on a LA freeway. The Commonwealth Club in turn awarded Reinventing Los Angeles at its California Book Awards gathering for its “Californiana” prize.

Food Justice (2010)
With UEPI colleagues, he established the Center for Food Justice and launched multiple initiatives and research and policy work in such areas as school food, food and transportation, food procurement policies, and food and health. In 1996, Gottlieb helped organize one of the first farm-to-school programs in the US and established the Los Angeles, California, and National Farm to School Networks. While still at UCLA, he also supervised another groundbreaking student action research project that helped inspire the development of a Los Angeles Food Policy Council. Discussions within UEPI about the need to help define and identify the contours of a food justice approach led to Gottlieb's collaboration with UEPI colleague Anupama Joshi who became the executive director of the National Farm to School Network. The resulting book by Gottlieb and Joshi, Food Justice, provided, according to Jennifer Clapp, “an outstanding effort to clarify the concept and catalog various initiatives and groups that are part of broader food justice movement.”

Global Cities (2017)
Gottlieb has collaborated with environmental justice groups organizing around the community, health, and environmental impacts from global trade, freight traffic, and the movement of goods. Through these collaborations, international linkages were established with researchers and policy research groups, including with Civic Exchange, a leading research-policy think tank based in Hong Kong. Gottlieb arranged talks in LA for Civic Exchange's Research Director, Simon Ng, and Gottlieb in turn was invited by Civic Exchange and groups at Mainland China Universities to give presentations about his work and the action research work of UEPI and its community partners. Ng and Gottlieb then collaborated to produce Global Cities: Urban Environments in Los Angeles, Hong Kong, and China (MIT Press, 2017).

Care Politics (2022)
Shortly before he retired from teaching at Occidental in 2015, Gottlieb gave the annual lecture for the college's Graham L. Sterling Memorial Award for Professional Achievement and Teaching. He titled the talk “My Action Research Journey: From the Port Authority Statement to Food Justice” in which he reviewed the research and activism that he'd been engaged in for more than 50 years. He was also profiled the next year in a short documentary, “Bob Gottlieb: Beneath the Paving Stones: A River,” produced by Kelly Candaele that also traced his research and political and community engagement. In both the lecture and the film, Gottlieb introduced the term “care-centered politics, resulting in his forthcoming book, Care-Centered Politics: From the Home to the Planet (MIT Press, 2022)

Awards and honors

References 

1944 births
21st-century American academics
20th-century American academics
Occidental College faculty
University of California, Los Angeles faculty
American social justice activists
Environmental justice scholars
American environmentalists
Historians of California
Living people